The Yí River (Spanish, Río Yí) is a river in Uruguay. The Yí and the Tacuarembó Rivers are the principal tributaries of the Río Negro.

Geography
The Yí River originates in the Cuchilla Grande highlands. It flows generally west through central Uruguay to the Río Negro.

Various other rivers, including the Porongos River and Chamangá River, are tributaries of the Yí River.

Departmental boundaries
The Yí forms much of the boundary between Durazno Department and Florida Department.

Subsequently, it forms part of the boundary between Durazno Department and Flores Department, where the Chamangá River its tributary.

See also
 Geography of Uruguay#Topography and hydrography
 Porongos River#Fluvial system
 Chamangá River#Fluvial system

References

Rivers of Uruguay
Tributaries of the Uruguay River
Rivers of Durazno Department
Rivers of Florida Department
Rivers of Flores Department